{{Speciesbox
| image = Acokanthera_schimperi_-_Köhler–s_Medizinal-Pflanzen-150.jpg
| image_caption = Acokanthera schimperi
| genus = Acokanthera
| species = schimperi
| authority = (A.DC.) Schweinf.
| synonyms = 
 Acokanthera abyssinica K.Schum. nom. illeg.
 Acokanthera deflersii Schweinf. ex Lewin
 Acokanthera friesiorum Markgr.
 Acokanthera ouabaio Cathelineau ex Lewin
 Acokanthera schimperi (A. DC.) Benth. & Hook. f.
 Arduina schimperi (A.DC.) Baill.
 Carissa deflersii (Schweinf. ex Lewin) Pichon
 Carissa friesiorum (Markgr.) Cufod.
 Carissa inepta Perrot & Vogt
 Carissa schimperi A.DC.
| synonyms_ref = 
}}Acokanthera schimperi, arrow poison tree, belonging to the family Apocynaceae, is a small tree native to eastern and central Africa as well as to Yemen.

 Uses 
The bark, wood and roots of Acokanthera schimperi are used as an important ingredient of arrow poison in Africa. All plant parts contain acovenoside A and ouabaïne, which are cardiotonic glycosides. Its fruit is edible, and is eaten as a famine food. When ripe they are sweet but also slightly bitter. Unripe fruits have caused accidental poisoning as they are highly toxic.

The maned rat spreads the plant's poison on its fur and becomes poisonous.

It is also used in traditional African medicine. In Ethiopia, for example, Acokanthera schimperi leaves have been traditionally used for jaundice.

 Geographic distribution Acokanthera schimperi'' is native to Eritrea, Ethiopia, Somalia, Somaliland, Kenya, Uganda, Tanzania, Rwanda and DR Congo. It is the only species in the genus that also occurs outside Africa, in southern Yemen.

References

External links
Acokanthera schimperi information from NPGS/GRIN
 Acokanthera schimperi information from PROTA4U

schimperi
Flora of Africa
Plants used in traditional African medicine
Flora of Yemen
Poisonous plants